Martadoris limaciformis is a species of sea slug, a dorid nudibranch, a marine gastropod mollusk in the family Polyceridae.

Distribution
This species was described from 2 m depth at Shab ul Shubuk, Sudan, Red Sea, . It has been reported from the Indian Ocean and Indonesia.

References

Polyceridae
Gastropods described in 1908